Antonio d'Enrico, called Tanzio da Varallo, or simply il Tanzio (c. 1575/1580 – c. 1632/1633) was an Italian painter of the late-Mannerist or early Baroque period.

Biography
He was born in Giacomolo hamlet, in Alagna Valsesia, and was active mainly in Lombardy and Piedmont, including the Sacro Monte at Varallo Sesia, where he worked contemporaneously with Pier Francesco Mazzucchelli (il Morazzone). He painted a Circumcision for Fara San Martino, and a Virgin with saints for the Collegiate at Pescocostanzo. Some of his paintings acquire the influence of Tenebrist styles and morbid thematic characteristic of the followers of Caravaggio and also of many Lombard painters, including his somewhat gruesome David with Goliath (1620). His animated and crowded Battle of Sennacherib (1627–28) for the Basilica of San Gaudenzio reflects the influence of his work in the Sacri Monti of Piedmont and Lombardy, painting scenographic diorama scenes.

His brother Melchiorre was also a painter, studied in Milan, and painted a last judgement for the parish of Riva.

Works
Madonna col Bambino, San Francesco e donatore, oil on canvas, c. 1610, Colledimezzo (CH), parish church of San Giovanni Evangelista.
Circumcision, oil on canvas, c. 1610, Fara San Martino (CH), church of San Remigio.
Pentecost (5 fragments), oil on canvas, Naples, previously in church of Santa Restituta, now in the Museo di Capodimonte.
Madonna dell'incendio sedato, oil on canvas, 1614, Pescocostanzo (AQ), collegiate church of Santa Maria in Colle.
San Carlo attends those afflicted with plague, oil on canvas, 1615–16, Domodossola (VB), collegiate church of Santi Gervasio e Protasio.
Sant'Antonio da Padova, oil on canvas, Varallo Sesia, Pinacoteca Civica.
San Sebastiano curato da Sant'Irene e un angelo, oil on canvas, National Gallery of Art, Washington, Samuel H. Kress Collection.
Christ taken to court of Pilate for first time, fresco, 1617–18, Varallo Sesia, Sacro Monte, Cappella XXVII.
Pilate washes his hands, fresco, 1619–20, Varallo Sesia, Sacro Monte, Cappella XXXIV.
San Giovanni Evangelista, Santa Caterina d’Alessandria, San Teodoro e Santa Apollonia, oil on canvas, 1618, Verbania – Pallanza, Museo del Paesaggio.
Davide con la testa di Golia, oil on canvas, Varallo Sesia, Pinacoteca Civica.
Gentiluomo, oil on canvas, Milan, Pinacoteca di Brera.
Gentildonna, oil on canvas, Milan, Pinacoteca di Brera.
Testa di gentiluomo, oil on copper, Gallarate, Museo Gallaratese di Studi Patri.
San Gerolamo, oil on canvas, Kansas City, The Nelson-Atkins Museum of Art.
Adorazione dei pastori, 1605–1610, Palais des beaux-arts de Lille.
La Vergine col Bambino adorata dai santi Domenico e Francesco, oil on canvas, Lumellogno (NO), church of Santi Ippolito e Cassiano.
Due angeli che reggono la corona della Vergine, oil on canvas, Varallo Sesia, Pinacoteca.
Jacob and Rachel, oil on canvas, Turin, Galleria Sabauda.
Visitation, oil on canvas, Vagna, frazione of Domodossola, church of San Brizio.
Gentiluomo, oil on canvas, c.1625, Cleveland (Ohio), The Cleveland Museum of Art.
Adoration of shepherds with San Carlo Borromeo, oil on canvas, Turin, Museo Civico di Arte Antica.
Adoration dei pastori con San Francesco e San Carlo Borromeo, oil on canvas, Los Angeles, Los Angeles Country Museum of Art.
La fuga in Egitto, oil on canvas, Houston, The Museum of Fine Arts, Samuel H. Kress Collection.
San Giovanni Battista nel deserto, oil on canvas, Tulsa, Oklahoma, Philbrook Museum of Art.
Gesù davanti ad Erode, fresco, 1628, Varallo Sesia, Sacro Monte, 1628, Cappella XXVIII.
San Carlo porta in processione il Sacro Chiodo, oil on canvas, c. 1629, Cellio (VC), parish church of San Lorenzo.
Santi in adorazione della Trinità, Fontaneto d’Agogna (NO), oil on canvas, parish church of Beata Vergine Assunta.
I Santi Pietro e Marco, oil on canvas, Turin, Galleria Sabauda.
Crucifixion, oil on canvas, Gerenzano, parish church of Santi Pietro e Paolo.
Decorazione della cappella dell'Angelo Custode, fresco, and Sennacherib sconfitto dall'Angelo, oil on canvas, 1617–19, Novara, Basilica di San Gaudenzio.
Sennacherib sconfitto dall'Angelo, oil on canvas, c. 1618, Novara, Museo Civico.
Annuncio dei pastori, Adorazione dei pastori, Gloria angelica, 1631–32, fresco, Milan, Santa Maria della Pace.
Il Redentore in gloria, I profeti Daniele e Isaia, Angeli musicanti, fresco, 1631–32, Milan, church of Sant’Antonio Abate.
St Roch, oil on canvas, Varallo Sesia, Pinacoteca (previously in the parish church of Camasco, frazione of Varallo Sesia).
La Madonna col Bambino e i santi Carlo e Francesco, oil on canvas, Varallo Sesia, Pinacoteca.
Martyrdom of Franciscans in Nagasaki, oil on canvas, Milan, Pinacoteca di Brera.
Beato Giovanni Tavelli da Tossignano, oil on canvas, Varallo Sesia, Pinacoteca.
Decorazione a fresco della cappella Gibellini, Borgosesia (VC), collegiate church of Santi Pietro e Paolo.

Sources

 Artnet biography from Grove Encyclopedia of Art.
Parts of this article were derived from its counterpart in the Italian Wikipedia, specifically from this version which provides the following bibliography:
Giovanni Testori, Il manierismo piemontese e lombardo del Seicento, 1955, catalogo della Mostra, Torino-Ivrea;
Giovanni Testori, Tanzio da Varallo, catalogo della mostra, Torino, 1959 (ora in G. Testori, La realtà della Pittura, Longanesi, Milano, 1995);
Marco Bona Castellotti, Introduzione alla mostra, in "Tanzio da Varallo. Realismo, fervore e contemplazione in un pittore del Seicento", Milano, Federico Motta Editore, 2000, (Catalogo della mostra su Tanzio tenuta a Milano, Palazzo Reale);
Filippo Maria Ferro, Tanzio e l’Angelo, ibidem;
Elena De Filippis, Tanzio al Sacro Monte, ibidem;

Footnotes

External links
    
Painters of reality: the legacy of Leonardo and Caravaggio in Lombardy, an exhibition catalog from The Metropolitan Museum of Art (fully available online as PDF), which contains material on Varallo (see index)

16th-century births
1630s deaths
People from the Province of Vercelli
16th-century Italian painters
Italian male painters
17th-century Italian painters
Painters from Milan
Mannerist painters
Alagna Valsesia